Martha Miriam Greenhouse (June 14, 1921 – January 5, 2013) was an American stage, film and television actress, who also served as an actors' union leader.

The Omaha, Nebraska-born actress spent her formative years in New York City, and was a 1939 graduate of the acclaimed Hunter College High School. She appeared both on-and off-Broadway. Her film credits included The Stepford Wives, Bananas, Daniel, and Tomorrow Night. She appeared on such television and soap opera series as Route 66, Car 54, Where Are You?, Law & Order, The Jackie Gleason Show, The Phil Silvers Show, Ryan's Hope, and Love Is a Many Splendored Thing.

Union leadership 
Greenhouse served as AFTRA' New York branch president for five terms, and on the Screen Actors Guild's National Board from 1981 to 1987. For her union service she was awarded the Founder's Award, the Ken Harvey Award and the George Heller Gold Card.

References

External links

1921 births
2013 deaths
American film actresses
American television actresses
American soap opera actresses
American musical theatre actresses
Actresses from Omaha, Nebraska
20th-century American actresses
AFL–CIO people
21st-century American women